Philip Raymond Judd (born 20 March 1953) is a New Zealand singer-songwriter known for being one of the founders of the bands Split Enz and The Swingers.

Split Enz
In 1972, Judd and Tim Finn founded the arty folk band Split Enz. In its early days the band was known for its eccentric behaviour, wacky clothes, makeup and crazy hairstyles. In the early days the band members all adopted their middle names, with the exception of Phil Judd, the only member from that era to use his first name.

While the other members of the Enz had hairstyles that were out of the ordinary, Judd chose to shave his head after the release of the first album Mental Notes. After the second album Second Thoughts was released, tension arose between Judd and Tim Finn. Judd left the band in 1977 shortly after the release of the single Another Great Divide, to be replaced by Finn's younger brother Neil Finn.

After leaving the Enz, Judd wrote songs and recorded demos until later that year he was approached by Tim Finn to rejoin the band. The Enz toured in 1978 with two lead guitarists in Judd and Neil Finn, who got along rather well. During this time the band played some new songs by Judd that won favour with the audience, including a self-confessed favourite of keyboardist Eddie Rayner, "Play It Strange".

Later that year, Judd once again left the group. It was after this time that Split Enz went on to their greatest international success.

After Split Enz
After leaving Split Enz, Judd became involved with Auckland punk band The Suburban Reptiles. He produced their second single, "Saturday Night Stay at Home", and performed live with them. He was also briefly a member of Chris Knox's band The Enemy. Out of the remnants of The Suburban Reptiles he formed The Swingers with future Midnight Oil band member Bones Hillman and Buster Stiggs. The band went through a couple of lineup changes, but managed to release a No. 1 song in New Zealand and Australia, "Counting The Beat". The song was used in the 1990s on commercials for DEKA chain of general merchandise stores, and was also used for the New Zealand TV3 Slogan "There aint no place I'd rather be" in 2011. The Swingers also wrote lyrics and composed music for Gillian Armstrong's 1982 New Wave musical Starstruck.

After The Swingers broke up in 1982, Judd recorded the Private Lives solo album, released by Mushroom Records in 1983. It would be 24 years before he released his next solo album. In the US, selections from Private Lives were released as a five-track EP called The Swinger.

In 1986 Tim Finn contacted Judd to write some songs for his new album Big Canoe. It would have been the first time they were to write together since Split Enz. According to Finn, instead of writing, the two spent most of the time drinking and catching up on old times and wrote no material. Instead, Judd played guitar on the album.

Schnell Fenster
In the late 1980s, Judd went on to be part of Schnell Fenster and was involved in recording movie soundtracks, most notably The Big Steal, winning the AFI award for his first score Death in Brunswick. Schnell Fenster was composed of former Split Enz members Nigel Griggs, Noel Crombie and Eddie Rayner, along with guitarist Michael den Elzen. Rayner left the project soon after its birth.

The debut album The Sound of Trees was a moderate success, but due to Noel Crombie developing tinnitus, the band was unable to tour extensively to support the album. A second album, OK Alright A Huh Oh Yeah, was released in Australia and New Zealand in 1991. The band then broke up.

Judd has worked in movies, including Rikky and Pete, Amy, and Mr Reliable, and on television programs such as Good Guys Bad Guys, Stingers and Sky Trackers.

Split Enz reunite without Judd
Judd has been reported as feeling bitter about not being invited to join Split Enz on their 2006 reunion tour. In an interview on community radio program Living in the Land of Oz, Judd said that Neil Finn wanted him to "get up and do two or three songs or at least be involved somehow" but this did not happen at either of the Melbourne concerts. On stage with the Enz in 2006, Tim Finn claimed that his relationship with Judd is "complicated".

Around the time of the Enz tour, Judd and Tim Finn had decided to get together with former Enz violinist Miles Golding for a few recording sessions dubbed 3 of a Kind. With the success of the Finn Brothers' latest album and the resurgence of interest in Split Enz, Tim Finn was offered a chance to release another solo album through EMI and took it. This left no time for any side projects and the project has not come to fruition.

Mr Phudd
Judd sells copies of Mr Phudd and His Novelty Act through his website. Some fans have likened it to his work from his days with Split Enz. Judd is also a visual artist and his surrealistic portrayal of Split Enz for the band's 1975 Mental Notes album won a music industry award for best cover design. He has continued to paint over the years and has work in the National Gallery of Victoria.

In 2006, Phil worked with Australian band Pinky Tuscadero, producing their EP Look Your Best.

His album Love is a Moron was released in December 2008.

Personal life
In 1992, Judd was diagnosed with bipolar disorder. He suffered a stroke in 2004 which damaged his spleen.

Judd was convicted in March 2009 of stalking three sisters in his Melbourne neighbourhood. He received a 12-month suspended sentence. On 1 January 2010, Judd was jailed for two weeks for violating a restraining order brought against him by his ex-wife during a dispute over custody of their young son.

Discography

Albums

Films
Starstruck (1982) – music, actor (one of the Swingers)
Rikky and Pete (1988) – songs, actor
The Big Steal (1990) – music
Death in Brunswick (1991) – music
Eight Ball (1992) – music
Hercules Returns (1992) – music
"Environmental" (1994) (short) – music
Mr. Reliable (1996) – music
Amy (1998) – music

TV
Sky Trackers (1994) – music (with others)
Good Guys Bad Guys (1997) – music, including theme
Stingers (1998) – music, including theme

Music for several Melbourne Theatre Company plays 1989–1993 including Miss Bosnia, Cosi and Summer of the Aliens, directed by Nadia Tass.

Lyricist for The Lion The Witch & The wardrobe songs, A touring musical production 2001–2003.

Awards and nominations

ARIA Music Awards
The ARIA Music Awards is an annual awards ceremony that recognises excellence, innovation, and achievement across all genres of Australian music. They commenced in 1987. 

! 
|-
| 1992
| Death in Brunswick
| Best Original Soundtrack, Cast or Show Album
| 
| 
|-

References

 Chunn, Mike, Stranger Than Fiction: The Life and Times of Split Enz, GP Publications, 1992. 
 Chunn, Mike, Stranger Than Fiction: The Life and Times of Split Enz, (revised, ebook edition), Hurricane Press, 2013. 
 Dix, John, Stranded in Paradise: New Zealand Rock and Roll, 1955 to the Modern Era, Penguin Books, 2005,

External links
Official site
 
 

1953 births
APRA Award winners
Living people
New Zealand rock musicians
New Zealand new wave musicians
Split Enz members
Ukulele players
Mandolinists
People educated at Hastings Boys' High School
New Zealand expatriates in Australia
New Zealand expatriates in England
New Zealand male guitarists
New Zealand male singer-songwriters
People with bipolar disorder
People convicted of stalking
20th-century New Zealand male singers
20th-century New Zealand painters
20th-century New Zealand male artists
21st-century New Zealand male singers
21st-century New Zealand painters
21st-century New Zealand male artists
Lead guitarists